The 1906 Svenska Mästerskapet Final was played on 7 October 1906 between the ninth-time finalists Örgryte IS and the second-time finalists Djurgårdens IF. The match decided the winner of 1906 Svenska Mästerskapet, the football cup to determine the Swedish champions. Örgryte IS won their eighth title with a 4–3 victory at Idrottsparken in Stockholm.

Route to the final

Örgryte IS 

In the quarter-final, Örgryte IS won against Malmö BK on walkover on 9 September 1906. On 23 September 1906, Örgryte played the semi-final against IFK Eskilstuna at home in Gothenburg and won, 3–1.

Örgryte were reigning back to back champions by winning the 1904 and the 1905 finals, the 1904 edition against final opponents Djurgården, and made their ninth appearance in a Svenska Mästerskapet final, having won seven, including the one against final opponents Djurgården, lost one, and only missed two.

Djurgårdens IF 

Djurgårdens IF entered in the quarter-final against IFK Norrköping on 9 September 1906 and won 8–0 at home in Stockholm. On 23 September 1906, Djurgården played the semi-final against Gefle IF and won, 3–2 at home.

Djurgården made their second Svenska Mästerskapet final after having lost to final opponents Örgryte IS in their previous appearance in the 1904 final.

Match details

References 

Print

1906
1906 in Swedish football
Djurgårdens IF Fotboll matches
Örgryte IS matches
Football in Stockholm
October 1906 sports events
Sports competitions in Stockholm
1900s in Stockholm